De Mens is a Flemish rock band from Belgium.  The current members of the band are Frank Vander linden, Michel de Coster, and Dirk Jans.

History

After playing in many hobby groups together, long-time friends Vander linden and De Coster decided to start De Mens. Vander linden, a journalist for the Belgian magazine Humo, left his job to pursue a career as a full-time musician. In 1992 the band released its first radio single, "Dit is mijn huis" ("This Is My House"), followed by the full album De Mens. Later came other successful singles "Jeroen Brouwers (schrijft een boek)" ("Jeroen Brouwers [Writes a Book]") and "Irene".

The band's second album, called Ik wil meer (I Want More), contains the singles "Nederland" ("The Netherlands"), "Zij zit daar en ik zit hier" ("She Is Sitting There and I Am Sitting Here"), and "Lachen en mooi zijn" ("Smiling and Being Pretty"). Meanwhile, Vander linden developed a reputation as writer. Thanks to his success in the Studio Brussel radio programme Collage, he has frequently been asked to be a columnist and spoken-word performer.

In the winter of 1995, Vander linden went on a small tour titled Solo bij u thuis. A mini-CD, Patti Blues, followed.  During that same winter, the band recorded a new album titled Wil je beroemd zijn? (Do You Want to Be Famous?) at the ICP studios in Brussels. It spawned two popular singles, "Maandag" ("Monday") and "Sheryl Crow I Need You So".

De Mens embarked on a partly acoustic theatre tour from October to November 1997. A compilation CD followed, containing the radio singles "Ik wil een vrouw zijn" ("I Want to Be a Woman"), "Val niet in liefde" ("Don't Fall into Love"), and some brand-new songs.

The band signed up with the Play It Again Sam record company, and released the album Sex verandert alles (Sex Changes Everything). It was recorded partly in the ICP studios and partly at home. The singles "Einde van de eeuw" ("The End of the Century") and "Sex verandert alles" ("Sex Changes Everything") scored well in the alternative charts. A club tour followed. Meanwhile, Vander linden became a regular panel member in the television quiz show Nonkel pop on a channel of the Belgian public broadcaster VRT. He also played himself in the film Film 1 by Willem Wallyn.

Since then, they have released five more albums: Liefde (Love) with hit single "Ergens onderweg" ("Somewhere down the road"), Blond (Blonde) with hit single "Kamer in Amsterdam" ("Room in Amsterdam"), In het Gras (In The Grass) Onder de Duinen (Below the dunes), with hit single Luide Muziek in Kleine Auto's (Loud Music in Small Cars) and recently  Is dit mijn hart? (Is this my Heart?) with hit single Hier komt mijn Schip (Here comes my Ship).

Discography

Studio albums
1992: De Mens
1994: Ik wil meer
1996: Wil je beroemd zijn?
1999: Sex verandert alles
2001: Liefde
2003: Blond
2005: In het gras
2007: Onder de duinen
2010: Is dit mijn hart?
2012: Muziek!
2014: Nooit genoeg
2017: 24 uur

Compilations
1997: De Mens Deluxe
2004: Akoestisch

References

External links
De Mens Official Website
De Mens entry in The Belgian Pop & Rock Archives
 Guitar tabs
Flanders Musiccenter
Muzikum Lyrics
Homepage of Frank Vander linden

Belgian rock music groups